Phúc Thọ is a district (huyện) of Hanoi, formerly of Hà Tây province, in the Red River Delta region of Vietnam.

Phúc Thọ district is bordered by Đan Phượng district to the east, Sơn Tây town to the west, Thạch Thất district to the south, Quốc Oai district and Hoài Đức district to the southeast, Vĩnh Phúc province to the north.

Districts of Hanoi